London Buses route 4 is a Transport for London contracted bus route in London, England. Running between Archway and Blackfriars, it is operated by Metroline.

History

On 25 September 1993, the contract for route 4 was won by London Suburban Bus, who operated the route with Leyland Titans.

On 27 April 1995, route 4 was included in the sale of London Suburban Bus to Metroline and in March 2000 to DelGro Corporation.

In April 2019, TfL announced that route 4 would be shortened between Waterloo and New Change and extended to Blackfriars via Queen Victoria Street instead, with the change scheduled to take effect in June of that year.

Current route
Route 4 operates via these primary locations:
Archway station 
Whittington Hospital
Tufnell Park station 
Holloway Road Nags Head
Finsbury Park station  
Highbury & Islington station   
Angel station 
Barbican station 
St Paul's station 
St Paul's Churchyard
Millennium Bridge
Blackfriars

References

External links

Bus routes in London
Transport in the London Borough of Islington
Transport in the London Borough of Southwark
Transport in the London Borough of Hackney
Transport in the City of London
Transport in the City of Westminster